ADempiere   is an Enterprise Resource Planning  or ERP software package released under a free software license. The verb adempiere in Italian means "to fulfill a duty" or "to accomplish".

The software is licensed under the GNU General Public License.

History
The ADempiere project was created in September 2006.  Disagreement between the open-source developer community that formed around the Compiere open-source ERP  software and the project's corporate sponsor ultimately led to the creation of Adempiere as a fork of Compiere.
Within weeks of the fork, ADempiere reached the top five of the SourceForge.net rankings. This ranking provides a measure of both the size of its developer community and also its impact on the open-source ERP software market.

The project name comes from the Italian verb "adempiere", which means "fulfillment of a duty" but with the additional senses of "Complete, reach, practice, perform tasks, or release; also, give honor, respect", here which were considered appropriate to what the project aimed to achieve.

Goals of this project
The goal of the Adempiere project is the creation of a community-developed and supported open source business solution. The Adempiere community follows the open-source model of the Bazaar described in Eric Raymond's article The Cathedral and the Bazaar.

Business functionality
The following business areas are addressed by the Adempiere application:
 Enterprise Resource Planning (ERP)
 Supply Chain Management (SCM)
 Customer Relationship Management (CRM)
 Financial Performance Analysis
 Integrated Point of sale (POS) solution
 Cost Engine for different Cost types
 Two different Productions (light and complex) which include Order batch and Material Requirements Planning (or Manufacturing Resource Planning).

Project structure
All community members are entitled to their say in the project discussion forums. For practical purposes, the project is governed by a council of contributors. A leader is nominated from this council to act as overall project manager.  The role of the Adempiere Council is to:
 Support decisions of the leader.
 Accept contributions.
 Define the roadmap.
 Review and approve specifications.
 Vote for new functionalities.
 Approve changes to core.

Technology
Adempiere is developed with Java EE technology, specifically utilizing Apache Tomcat and the JBoss application server.  Currently database support is restricted to PostgreSQL and Oracle.

Architecture
Adempiere inherited the Data Dictionary from the Compiere project.  This architecture extends the Data Dictionary concept into the application; thus the application's entities, their validation rules and screen layout can be controlled from within the application itself. In practice, this means that customization of the application can be done without new coding.
A Workflow Management Coalition and Object Management Group standards based workflow engine is utilized to provide Business Process Management.  These features allow for the rapid customization of the application to a business's needs.

See also
 Compiere, iDempiere, metasfresh, Openbravo (Compiere source code family)

 List of ERP software packages
 List of ERP vendors
List of free and open source software packages

forks 

iDempiere It modularized the code through the OSGi framework so it allows a plugin architecture.
metasfresh - originally based on ADempiere, developed in Germany.

References

Notes

Top Open Source ERPs
Heise Online -Technology News Portal
GudangLinux note
LinuxPR note
InfoWorld article
Full Open Source compliance and Database independence, one step closer with Adempiere first release 
Compiere User Community Splits; Code Forks

External links
 Official Community website

Free customer relationship management software
Free ERP software
Free software programmed in Java (programming language)
Software forks
Enterprise resource planning software for Linux